A hostess club is a type of night club found primarily in Japan. They employ primarily female staff and cater to men seeking drinks and attentive conversation. The modern host club is a similar type of establishment where primarily male staff attend to women. Host and hostess clubs are considered part of mizu shōbai (literally "water trade"), the night-time entertainment business in Japan.

Hostess clubs

Japan

They light cigarettes, provide beverages for men, offer flirtatious conversation, and sing karaoke to entertain customers. They can be seen as the modern counterpart of geishas, providing entertainment to groups of salarymen after work. The clubs also often employ a female bartender usually well-trained in mixology, and who may also be the manager or mamasan. Hostess clubs are distinguished from strip clubs in that there is no dancing, prostitution or nudity.

Hostesses often drink with customers each night, and alcohol problems are fairly common. These problems can be the result of frequent consumption of alcohol, from which many consequences may arise. Most bars use a commission system by which hostesses receive a percentage of sales. For example, a patron purchases a $20 drink for the hostess, these are usually non-alcoholic concoctions like orange juice and ginger ale, and the patron has purchased the hostess's attention for the subsequent 30–45 minutes. The hostess then splits the proceeds of the sale with the bar 50/50. The light or no alcohol content of the drinks maximizes profits and ensures that the hostess does not become intoxicated after only a short time at work.

Businesses may pay for tabs on company expense with the aim of promoting trust among male co-workers or clients. At one establishment, about 90% of all tabs were reportedly paid for by companies.

Patrons are generally greeted comfortably at the door and seated as far away from other customers as possible. In some instances, a customer is able to choose with whom he spends time, while most often that is decided by the house. In either case, the hostess will leave after a certain amount of time or number of drinks, offering the customer a chance to see a fresh face. While most establishments have male touts outside to bring in customers, it may also fall upon a (usually new) hostess to do so. While hostess clubs are clearly gendered in the way that women serve men, research has also revealed the complexity of intra-gender dynamics and sometimes tension among hostesses as well, and the ways that male customers often work to mitigate problems among hostesses as well as between hostesses and Mama-san.

Hostess clubs have a strict "no touching" policy, and patrons who try to initiate private or sexual conversation are removed. However a red-light district version of the host/hostess club exists, called seku-kyabakura or ichya-kyabakura, where patrons are permitted to touch their host/hostess above the waist and engage in sexual conversation topics or kissing, although this type of establishment is not common. Normal hostess clubs are classified as food and entertainment establishments and regulated by the Businesses Affecting Public Morals Regulation Act, prohibiting any form of sexual contact between employees and customers. Normal hostess clubs also need a permit to allow dancing. Clubs are inspected often by the Public Safety Commission. Any club found violating its permitted activities can have its business license suspended, until corrections are made.

Hostessing is a popular employment option among young foreign women in Japan, as demand is high. Most visa types do not allow this type of work (as hostessing falls under the category of ), so many choose to work illegally. The clubs sometimes take advantage of the women's precarious legal situation. The industry and its dangers were highlighted in 1992 when Carita Ridgway, an Australian hostess, was drugged and killed after a paid date, and in 2000 when Lucie Blackman, a British hostess, was abducted, raped and murdered by the same customer. The government promised to crack down on illegal employment of foreigners in hostess bars, but an undercover operation in 2006 found that several hostess bars were willing to employ a foreign woman illegally. In 2007, the Japanese government began taking action against these hostess clubs, causing many to be shut down and many hostesses to be arrested and deported.

In December 2009 the Kyabakura Union was formed to represent hostess bar workers (see "Kyabakura Union" below).

Snack bars

A , or "snack" for short, refers to a kind of hostess bar, an alcohol-serving bar that employs female staff who are paid to serve and flirt with male customers. Although they do not charge an entry fee (and often have no set prices on their menus), they usually either have an arbitrary charge or charge a set hourly fee plus a "bottle charge". (Customers purchase a bottle in their own name, and it is kept for future visits.)

Venues outside Japan
Hostess bars are also found in other east Asian countries, and in Hawaii, Guam, California, and Vancouver, Canada. In Hawaii, approximately half of Oahu's 300 bars are licensed as hostess bars.

Some bars in Thailand label themselves as hostess bars; these are loosely related to the East Asian practice, although they are basically a class of the local go-go bars that do not feature dancing.

Host clubs

A  is similar to a hostess club, except that female customers pay for male company. Host clubs are typically found in more populated areas of Japan, and are famed for being numerous in Tokyo districts such as Kabukichō, and Osaka's Umeda and Namba. Customers are typically wives of rich men, or women working as hostesses in hostess clubs.<ref>Japan , The International Encyclopedia of Sexuality, 1997–2001</ref>

The first host club was opened in Tokyo in 1966. In 1996, the number of Tokyo host clubs was estimated to be 200, and a night of non-sexual entertainment could cost US$500–600. Professor Yoko Tajima of Hosei University explained the phenomenon by Japanese men's lack of true listening to the problems of women, and by women's desire to take care of a man and be loved back.

Host ROLAND has become a mainstream TV personality. In addition to holding various records in regards to his host career, he is also a businessman. Entertainer Jin Shirosaki worked as a host for five years. Comedian Hiroshi was also once a host. Ryuchalo gained international attention for being styled as a host from the age of 4 throughout elementary school by his blogger mother, Chiimero.

 Hosts 
Male hosts pour drinks and will often flirt with their clients, more so than their female counterparts. The conversations are generally light-hearted; hosts may have a variety of entertainment skills, be it simple magic tricks or charisma with which to tell a story. Some host clubs have a dedicated stage for a performance, usually a dance, comedy sketch, etc.

Hosts' ages usually range between 18 and the mid-20s. They will take a stage name, usually taken from a favourite manga, film, or historical figure, that will often describe their character. Men who become hosts are often those who either cannot find a white-collar job, or are enticed by the prospect of high earnings through commission.

A common look for a host is a dark suit, collared shirt, silver jewellery, a dark tan, and bleached hair.

Pay is usually determined by commission on drink sales with hosts often drinking far past a healthy limit, usually while trying to hide their drunkenness. Because the base hourly wage is usually extremely low, almost any man can become a host regardless of looks or charisma (depending on the bar). However, hosts who cannot increase their sales usually drop out very soon, because of the minimal wage. The environment in a host bar is usually very competitive, with tens of thousands of dollars sometimes offered to the host who can achieve the highest sales.

 Drinks 
Many of the clientele who visit host bars are hostesses who finish work at around 1:00 or 2:00 a.m., causing host bars to often begin business at around midnight and finish in the morning or midday, and hosts to work to the point of exhaustion. But business times have changed in recent years by order of the police due to the increased incidence of illegal prostitution by host club customers who could not pay the host club debts they had accumulated. Nowadays most of these clubs open about 4:00 p.m. and have to be closed between midnight and 2:00 a.m. Drinks usually start at about ¥1000 but can reach around ¥6 million (US$60,000) for a bottle of champagne.

All the hosts of the club will gather around the table for a song, talk, or a mic performance of some kind. The champagne will be drunk straight from the bottle by the customer, then her named host, and then the other hosts gathered. Often a wet towel will be held under the chin of the customer and hosts while they drink to prevent spills. The performance differs from club to club, and is believed to have originated at club Ryugujo in Kabukicho by the manager Yoritomo.

Also a  can usually be done for special events. Champagne glasses are arranged into a pyramid, and champagne is poured onto the top glass until it trickles down the layers of glasses. Depending on the champagne used, this can cost over 200万円 (US$20,000).

 Etiquette 
On the first visit to a host club, the customer is presented with a menu of the hosts available, and decide which host to meet first, but over the course of the night, the customer will meet most of the hosts. The customer then decides which host they like most, and can make him their . This can be done by buying a "bottle keep" (a bottle of liquor that can be saved for next time), stating interest in a host. The named host will receive a percentage of the future sales generated by that customer. Most clubs operate on a  system: once the named host has been nominated, a customer cannot change hosts at that club.

Sometimes a host will go with a customer for a meal or karaoke after hours. This is called . Staying longer at the host club is considered the proper way to treat a host. It is possible to go on day trips or travel with a host, but a host can only go with their own customer. A host interacting with another host's customer is liable to be fined or fired from the club. Drinks can be purchased on tab, but contact information is taken and the customer must pay later. If the customer does not pay, the host must. It is considered rude to leave a customer alone, called .

 Business strategy 
Usually, hosts try to make the clients feel loved without having sex with them, as it takes up their time and energy. Sometimes, for instance if a customer pays a large amount of money and/or if the host likes them in return, the host can have sex with the client. If the same host meets the same client, they have a higher chance of having sex than the host having sex with another client. The clients attempt to make the individuals very comfortable, thus they will feel compelled to provide for the businessmen in the future by some means. This exchange may be by political or economic means. There are other various methods of business. For example,  is the practice of a host emailing his customer regularly to ensure their return. Similarly, a host may call their customer, but this is fading in popularity now with the rise in popularity of mail business. Hosts will usually carry a business phone and a private phone.

Kyabakura Union
The  is a trade union for hostess club employees in Japan. It was formed on December 22, 2009 by Rin Sakurai, who formed the union in response to problems hostess-club employees reported with their employers, including harassment and unpaid wages. The union is affiliated with the Part-timer, Arbeiter, Freeter & Foreign Workers Union, often referred to as the "Freeter" Union.

Literature and films

Fiction
There are many Japanese fictional works, such as TV dramas, novels, s, manga (and anime adaptations) which revolve around hostesses or host clubs, such as Club 9, Bloodhound, and the more light-hearted Ouran High School Host Club. These works reaching a general audience shows how accepted the clubs have become in general society.  This even extends to non-Japanese fiction, for example with the crime novel Tokyo (2000), by British author Mo Hayder, which has as its main character a British hostess starting out in the industry. The episode "Meet Market" of the American TV drama CSI: Crime Scene Investigation featured a version of a host club in Las Vegas. In Isaac Adamson's novel Dreaming Pachinko, the character Miyuki worked at an exclusive hostess club in Ginza. The adventure video game series Yakuza allows the player to attend hostess clubs; some entries, such as Yakuza 0 and Yakuza Kiwami 2, have side-quests that allow the main character to become a host himself or manage a hostess club, gaining dominance in the area and hiring new talent. Japanese 2018 drama Todome no Kiss features Kento Yamazaki playing the role of a popular host under the stage name Eight, who works in a Kabukichō nightclub called Narcissus. D3 Publisher created Last Escort, a series of host club-themed otome dating sim visual novel games.

Rosa Kato starred in TV Asahi's Japanese drama called Jotei in which she played a poor high school drop out who is compelled to succeed in the hostess business and become the number one hostess in Tokyo after her mother passes away to undiagnosed cancer. Kyabasuka Gakuen, another Japanese drama shown on Nippon TV and Hulu, is about a group of high school girls who open a hostess club to raise funds to prevent their school being shut down due to debt. The 2004 film Stratosphere Girl follows a young Belgian woman joining a Tokyo hostess club and trying to solve the mystery of a missing Russian hostess. In the Starz show Crash, the character Inez works as a hostess in Los Angeles. In NTV's 2001 Ranma ½ live-action special/movie, Nabiki Tendo is a hostess at the establishment which her father, Ranma's father, and the antagonist frequent. A South Korean live-action film, Beastie Boys, is about two young men, Seung-woo and Jae-hyun, who serve as hosts or male escorts for a discreet private women's club in a posh district of Seoul. Hiro Mashima's manga Fairy Tail features a guild called "Blue Pegasus" which acts as a host club to both male and female patrons, while Hideaki Sorachi's manga Gintama has one of the main characters, Shimura Tae, work at a hostess club named 'Snack Smile', along with several storylines and one-shots being set in host clubs.

Non-fiction
There are several fashion and lifestyle magazines, for example Koakuma Ageha, which mainly cater to hostesses and/or hosts, and sometimes also to their recruiters and fans. Koakuma Ageha is known as an unconventional fashion magazine modeled by real hostesses, and it is one of the highest-selling fashion magazines in Japan.

The Shōhei Imamura documentary  (1970) tells the story of a hostess/prostitute in postwar Yokosuka, Kanagawa.

In the 1994 book Nightwork: Sexuality, Pleasure, and Corporate Masculinity in a Tokyo Hostess Club, anthropologist Anne Allison, informed by her own work in the mid-1980s as a hostess in a Japanese bar, describes hostess bars as providing an atmosphere where masculinity is "collectively realized and ritualized".

The 1995 documentary Shinjuku Boys by Kim Longinotto describes a Tokyo host club in Shinjuku staffed by trans men.Tokyo Girls is a 2000 documentary in which four Canadian women share their experiences working as hostesses in Japan.The Great Happiness Space: Tale of an Osaka Love Thief is a 2006 documentary about a host club in Osaka.

Japanese host, TV personality, and entrepreneur Roland released an autobiography titled Ore ka, Ore Igai ka. Roland Toiu Ikikata. (Kadokawa, March 11, 2019) 

China

KTV/hostess bar in China
KTVs are a source of interactive musical entertainment through the utilization of a karaoke bar by which words appear on a large interactive television. It is important to distinguish the difference in desirable environments for individuals of different age groups within the KTV. Individuals within their early thirties to late forties typically prefer the exclusive, private realms of rented rooms rather than the stereotypical open dance floor disco environment. KTVs are usually found in East Asian nations and are a principal location for Chinese business meetings.

Hostesses within the KTV
Chinese businessmen use various hostesses as a means of persuading the businessmen and as an outlet to earn favors in the future. This mentality is carried with many Chinese businessmen and has become the common perception on business for many of the Chinese men. These hostesses serve to please the client and allow the client to feel satisfied and trustworthy while present at the KTV.
Hostesses are expected to pressure businessmen to drink, sing and gain as much attention as possible.

The Chinese businessmen that visit the KTV maintain a main and sentimental priority of establishing connections within their respective companies. Hostesses internally degrade their personal and "moral appearance" in order to satisfy a sentiment of masculine pleasure. These implications directly integrate into the creation of hegemonic masculinity for the business world. This correlates to the value of male dominance throughout the business world and enhances the principle of hyper-masculinity which decreases diversity for Chinese ethics. This also leads to gender inequality for women not only in the KTVs, but more generally throughout many realms of life in China.

This may entail the loss of moral code and ethics for the women in the KTV. These bars and clubs proclaim that they are not a front for prostitution, yet it appears that these acts are the mere start of something much more serious, which may include aspects of prostitution as it is traditionally thought of in Western culture.  These values also relate to the foundations of Guanxi, by which there is created a hierarchical system of social order because men clearly possess more power in the KTV than do the hostesses. Hierarchy systems of power generally will lead to gender discrimination throughout the future and add to the already existing gap of gender implications in China. Guanxi also maintains the business order for the owners of the KTV by creating a workplace that is managed by a hierarchical power system where again hyper-masculinity is fully engaged in the men's favor.

Implications of mass alcohol consumption
KTVs are a typical location for Chinese business practices by which the businessmen attempt to formulate connections and loyalty amongst other various businessmen. The businessmen will try to establish a comfortable setting by providing fruit plates, women, or alcoholic drinks. Chinese businessmen can be potentially seen consuming baijiu up to six or seven days per week solely to portray their loyalty to the businessmen principles and fulfill the pleasurable environment of the KTV. Mass alcohol consumption has negative effects on the bodies of the individuals that frequently visit KTVs. These consequences may include mental, physical, ethical, or even moral issues for the men.

Alcohol is a very prominent factor of KTVs and suitable with the overall culture of East Asian nations. Extreme consumption methods are usually used by the Chinese businessmen in exchange for personal health and moral conduct similar to the hostesses sacrificing their moral ethics to please the male consumer.

Guanxi connection with the KTV
KTVs are used as a way to network within the business world through alcohol influenced cultivation of relationships with both "state officials and other entrepreneurs", which positively affects their "business ventures" . This idea of networking is known as building "guanxi". "Entrepreneurs" pursue prestige in their realm of business and the idea of prestige is overwhelmingly influenced by the strength of one's network to a point where entertaining clientele becomes a second job. By entertaining a client, these businessmen are essentially building networks that are usually more developed and enhanced than building networks through actual relatable work. Guanxi is not based upon the actual credibility of the worker or the specific work he or she does, but is actually based on the fundamental of deriving connections. This world of guanxi is based upon social networking with other businessmen rather than having a more efficient and diligent work ethic. Guanxi is an extremely powerful sentiment when it comes to connections and ranking up in a company or simply establishing yourself in the business world.

See also
Bargirl
List of public house topics
Prostitution in Japan
Maid cafe
Long-term effects of alcohol consumption
Karaoke box
Human sexuality

References

External links
 The Great Happiness Space: Documentary of Host Bar

Diary of a Tokyo hostess, Salon.com
My month as a poor man's geisha, The Standard'', 22 April 2006
Ken Tanaka interviews hosts and hostesses in Tokyo's Kabukichoo red light district, YouTube video.

Entertainment venues in Japan